The Inspector Wears Skirts (released in the United States as Top Squad and in the Philippines as Lady Enforcer) is a 1988 Hong Kong martial arts-action comedy produced by Jackie Chan, directed by Wellson Chin and starring Sibelle Hu, Cynthia Rothrock and Kara Hui. In common with many other Hong Kong films The Inspector Wears Skirts moves from genre to genre.

Synopsis
The film revolves around a crack squad of female police officers who have to deal with harassment and a lack of respect from their male colleagues, personal issues as well as some serious criminals.

Cast
 Sibelle Hu as Madam Wu
 Cynthia Rothrock as Madam Law
 Kara Hui as May
 Regina Kent as Aileen (credited as Jade Kan)
 Ellen Chan as Jean
 Alex To as Man
 Billy Lau as Nam
 Sandra Ng as Amy
 Ann Bridgewater as Karen
 Stanley Fung as Chief Kan
 Michael Chow as Peter
 Bill Tung as Commissioner Tung
 Jeff Falcon as Caucasian Jewel Thief
 Mars as Member of Tiger Squad
 Ken Lo as Member of Tiger Squad
 Shing Fui-On as Jewel Thief
 Benny Lai as Robber
 Ricky Hui as Canteen Chef

Release
The Inspector Wears Skirts was released in Hong Kong in 1988. In the Philippines, the film was released by First Films as Lady Enforcer on August 11, 1988.

Sequels
The film was followed by three sequels:
The Inspector Wears Skirts 2 (1989)
The Inspector Wears Skirts 3 (1990)
The Inspector Wears Skirts 4 (1992)

References

External links

The Inspector Wears Skirts at Hong Kong Movie Database
Love Hong Kong Film Article

1988 films
1988 comedy films
1988 martial arts films
1980s action comedy films
1980s Cantonese-language films
1980s police comedy films
Hong Kong action comedy films
Hong Kong martial arts comedy films
1980s Hong Kong films